Tron Erik Hovind (born 15 June 1956 in Ullensaker) is a Norwegian politician for the Centre Party.

He served as a deputy representative to the Norwegian Parliament from Akershus during the terms 1997–2001 and 2001–2005. From 1997 to 1999 he was a regular representative, covering for Anne Enger Lahnstein who was appointed to the first cabinet Bondevik.

Hovind held various positions in Ullensaker municipality council from 1983 to 2011, serving as deputy mayor from 1994 to 1997 and mayor from 1991 to 1993.

References

1956 births
Living people
Members of the Storting
Centre Party (Norway) politicians
Mayors of places in Akershus
People from Ullensaker
BI Norwegian Business School alumni
21st-century Norwegian politicians
20th-century Norwegian politicians